Ion Terente is a Romanian sprint canoer who competed in the early to mid-1970s. He won two medals in the K-2 10000 m event at the ICF Canoe Sprint World Championships with a gold in 1974 and a silver in 1973.

References

Living people
Romanian male canoeists
Year of birth missing (living people)
ICF Canoe Sprint World Championships medalists in kayak